Honduras competed at the 1988 Summer Olympics in Seoul, South Korea.

Competitors
The following is the list of number of competitors in the Games.

Results by event

Athletics

Men's 400 metres
 Jorge Fidel Ponce

Men's 400 m Hurdles
 Jorge Fidel Ponce

Men's 20 km Walk
 Santiago Fonseca
 Rafael Valladares

Boxing

Men's Light-Flyweight (– 48 kg)
 Darwin Angeles
First Round — bye
Second Round — Lost to Sam Stewart (LBR), 0:5

Men's Middleweight (– 75 kg)
 Roberto Martínez
First Round — bye
Second Round — Lost to Esa Hukkanen (FIN), 0:5

Swimming

Men's 50 m Freestyle
 Pablo Barahona
Heat – 25.79 (→ did not advance, 58th place)

 Plutarco Castellanos
Heat – 26.00 (→ did not advance, 60th place)

Men's 100 m Freestyle
 Plutarco Castellanos
Heat – 56.11 (→ did not advance, 64th place)

 Pablo Barahona
Heat – 57.97 (→ did not advance, 68th place)

Men's 100 m Backstroke
 Pablo Barahona
Heat – 1:03.90 (→ did not advance, 46th place)

Men's 200 m Backstroke
 Pablo Barahona
Heat – 2:21.61 (→ did not advance, 38th place)

Men's 100 m Butterfly
 Plutarco Castellanos
Heat – 1:02.69 (→ did not advance, 47th place)

Women's 50 m Freestyle
 Ana Joselina Fortin
Heat – 28.46 (→ did not advance, 38th place)

Women's 100 m Freestyle
 Ana Joselina Fortin
Heat – 1:01.11 (→ did not advance, 44th place)

Women's 100 m Backstroke
 Ana Joselina Fortin
Heat – 1:10.10 (→ did not advance, 33rd place)

Women's 200 m Backstroke
 Ana Joselina Fortin
Heat – 2:32.13 (→ did not advance, 29th place)

Women's 100 m Butterfly
 Ana Joselina Fortin
Heat – 1:07.99 (→ did not advance, 35th place)

References

Official Olympic Reports
sports-reference

Nations at the 1988 Summer Olympics
1988
1988 in Honduran sport